Robotman may refer to:

 Robotman (Cliff Steele), a DC Comics superhero and member of the Doom Patrol
 Robotman (Robert Crane), a Golden Age DC Comics superhero and a member of the All-Star Squadron
 Robotman & Friends, a 1985 television special
 Monty (comic strip), originally Robotman, an American syndicated comic strip by Jim Meddick
 "Robot Man", a 1960 song by Connie Francis
 "Robot Man", a 1981 song from the Rick Wakeman album 1984 featuring Chaka Khan
 "Robot Man", a 1975 song by Scorpions from the album In Trance

See also

 
 
 
 
 Mr. Robot (disambiguation)
 Man (disambiguation)
 Robot (disambiguation)
 Roboman (disambiguation)
 Robotoman (disambiguation)
 Android (disambiguation)
 Metalmen (disambiguation)